is a 1954 Japanese black-and-white period drama (jidaigeki) directed by Ryohei Arai.

Cast
 Yataro Kurokawa
 Kōtarō Bandō
 Miki Sanjo
 Kazuko Fushimi
 Eitarō Shindō

See also
 Forty-seven Ronin

References

External links
 

Jidaigeki films
Samurai films
Japanese black-and-white films
1954 films
Daiei Film films
Films directed by Ryohei Arai
1950s Japanese films